Richard Graham Lumb (born 27 February 1950, Doncaster, Yorkshire, England) is an English first-class cricketer, who started playing cricket for Brodsworth Main C.C. in Doncaster and then played for Yorkshire County Cricket Club from 1969 to 1984. He was educated at Richmond Hill primary school Sprotborough and Percy Jackson Grammar School Adwick le Street.  He was a tall, right-handed opening batsman of solid technique.  He formed an opening partnership with Geoff Boycott for his native county, and was a stalwart player in an era of scant success for the Yorkshire team.

He also played first-class cricket for the Marylebone Cricket Club (MCC) (1975–1980) Young England (1973), Rest of England (1976) and T. N. Pearce's XI (1976).  In addition, he appeared for the Yorkshire Second XI (1968–1984), Yorkshire Under-25s (1972–1974), and the Scarborough Festival XI  (1983) in non first-class games.  In 245 first-class matches he scored 11,723 runs, at an average of 31.17 with 22 hundreds, the largest being 165 not out against Gloucestershire, one of four centuries he recorded against them.  In 137 one day matches he made 2,784 runs at 25.30, with a best score of 101 against Nottinghamshire.

He is the brother in law of the South African first-class cricketer, A. J. S. Smith.  His son, Michael Lumb, also played for Yorkshire before moving to Hampshire for the 2007 season, and subsequently to Nottinghamshire in 2012.

References

External links
Cricinfo Profile

1950 births
Living people
Cricketers from Doncaster
English cricketers
Yorkshire cricketers
Marylebone Cricket Club cricketers
T. N. Pearce's XI cricketers
Young England cricketers
English cricketers of 1864 to 1889